Avera is a city in Jefferson County, Georgia, United States. As of the 2020 census, the city had a population of 223.

The city was incorporated in 1900.

Geography
Avera is located at  (33.194988, -82.527503).

Demographics

At the 2000 census there were 217 people in 99 households, including 60 families, in the city. The racial makeup of the city was 88.48% White, 10.60% African American, 0.46% from other races, and 0.46% from two or more races. Hispanic or Latino of any race were 0.46%.

Of the 99 households 26.3% had children under the age of 18 living with them, 47.5% were married couples living together, 9.1% had a female householder with no husband present, and 38.4% were non-families. 33.3% of households were one person and 15.2% were one person aged 65 or older.  The average household size was 2.19 and the average family size was 2.80.

The age distribution was 19.8% under the age of 18, 6.9% from 18 to 24, 32.3% from 25 to 44, 24.0% from 45 to 64, and 17.1% 65 or older.  The median age was 40 years. For every 100 females, there were 104.7 males.  For every 100 females age 18 and over, there were 91.2 males.

The median household income was $28,229 and the median family income  was $35,208. Males had a median income of $26,667 versus $20,938 for females. The per capita income for the city was $14,613.  About 8.2% of families and 6.5% of the population were below the poverty line, including none of those under the age of eighteen or sixty five or over.

See also

Central Savannah River Area

References

External links
The News and Farmer and Wadley Herald/ Jefferson Reporter, the county's weekly newspaper and the oldest weekly newspaper in Georgia.
Avera at The official website of the state of Georgia

Cities in Georgia (U.S. state)
Cities in Jefferson County, Georgia